Rosebud-Lott Independent School District is a consolidated public school district based in Lott, Texas, USA. The school mascot is the Cougar.

The district also serves the cities of  Rosebud, Lott and Westphalia. Located in Falls County, small portions of the district extend into Bell and Milam Counties.

In 2009, the school district was rated "academically acceptable" by the Texas Education Agency.

Schools
Rosebud-Lott High School (Grades 9–12)
Rosebud-Lott Middle School (Grades 7–8)
ROSEBUD-LOTT Elementary School (GRADES PRE-K – 6TH)

References

External links
Rosebud-Lott ISD

School districts in Falls County, Texas
School districts in Bell County, Texas
School districts in Milam County, Texas